Carters Brook, also known as Carter Brook, is a branch of the Heathcote Brook in Somerset and Middlesex counties, New Jersey in the United States.

Course

Accessibility
The Carters Brook is accessible by several roads.

Sister tributary
Heathcote Brook Branch

See also
List of rivers of New Jersey

References

External links
USGS Coordinates in Google Maps

Rivers of Somerset County, New Jersey
Rivers of Middlesex County, New Jersey
Tributaries of the Raritan River
Rivers of New Jersey